P. spilopterus may refer to:

Protomelas spilopterus, a cichlid species
Puntius spilopterus, a ray-finned fish species